Gião is a former civil parish in the municipality of Santa Maria da Feira, Portugal. In 2013, the parish merged into the new parish Lobão, Gião, Louredo e Guisande. It has a population of 1,676 inhabitants and a total area of 3.57 km2.  Its density was 470/km2.

References

External links 
 Biweekly Journal at Terras de Santa Maria

Former parishes of Santa Maria da Feira